Qari Hamed Shakernejad (Persian: حامد شاکرنژاد; born in May 1983, Mashhad, Iran), is an Iranian Qari (reciter of the Qur'an).Such as, many modern and young reciters try to imitate his style. Shakernejad won a world Qira'at competition on 15 March 1996 in Saudi Arabia. This win was followed by a gift from the king of Saudi Arabia, entering the Kaaba for an hour. This was the first time that an Iranian Qari had entered the Kaaba.

Early life 
Hamed Shakernejad was born in Mashhad near the Shrine of Imam Reza.

References 
Hamed Shakernejad's biography - Tebyan

Hamed Shakernejad's biography Tebyan - English

External links 
 Hamed Shakernejad's biography
 Videos Of Hamed Shaker Nejad - Online
 Shakernejad's Quran Recitation at myquran.de
 Hamed Shakernejad Paris Shams
 The best Quran Recitation, Hamed shakernejad  international competition of holy quran
 AMAZING !!! Hamed shakernejad
 Videos of Hamed Shakernejad

1983 births
Living people
Iranian Quran reciters
People from Mashhad